Mohun Bagan is a professional football club based in Kolkata, West Bengal, India. Established in 1889, it is one of the oldest football clubs in Asia and one of the most successful clubs in India.

In 1911, Mohun Bagan became the first Indian club to win a major title, when they defeated the East Yorkshire Regiment, 2–1 to lift the IFA Shield. With 14 Federation Cup titles and 5 National League/I-League titles, Mohun Bagan is the most successful club in India in major national tournaments.

History

Mohun Bagan played their first match in 1889 against Eden Hindu Hostel. They won their first ever title in 1904, lifting Coochbehar Cup. Mohun bagan have won more than 5000 (ATK Mohun Bagan) matches in their football history. Which is highest for an Indian club.

Domestic titles

National Football League/I-League

Mohun Bagan is the most successful club with 5 national league titles, along with Dempo, who also has 5 titles.

I-League
Winners (2): 2014–15, 2019–20
Runners-up (3): 2008–09, 2015-16, 2016-17
National Football League (shared record with East Bengal)
Winners (3): 1997–98, 1999–2000, 2001–02
Runners-up (1): 2000–01

Federation Cup

With 14 titles, Mohun Bagan is by far the most successful team in India's most important Cup competition. Mohun Bagan is the only Indian club to have won Federation Cup three consecutive times on two separate occasions.

 Federation Cup
Winners (14) (record): 1978, 1980, 1981, 1982, 1986, 1987, 1992, 1993, 1994, 1998, 2001, 2006, 2008, 2015–16
Runners-up (6): 1997, 1983, 1985, 2004, 2010, 2016–17

Indian Super Cup

Mohun Bagan has won the Super Cup twice, winning the first title in 2007.

 Indian Super Cup
Winners (2): 2007, 2009
Runners-up (2): 1998, 1999

Durand Cup

Mohun Bagan is jointly the most successful team in Durand Cup along with arch-rivals SC East Bengal, having won the title 16 times. Bagan is also the only Indian club to have won Durand Cup three consecutive times on two occasions. They are also the first Indian civilian club to be invited to participate in the Durand Cup.

 Durand Cup
Winners (16) (shared record with East Bengal): 1953, 1959, 1960, 1963, 1964, 1965, 1974, 1977, 1979, 1980, 1982, 1984, 1985, 1986, 1994, 2000
Runners-up (12): 1950, 1961, 1970, 1972, 1978, 1983, 1987, 1989, 1997, 2004, 2009, 2019

Calcutta Football League

Mohun Bagan won the Calcutta Football League for the first time in 1939. The first league title post independence came in 1951. The Mariners have clinched three consecutive league titles three times in their history. Mohun Bagan was the first club to win ten league titles in 1962.

 Calcutta Football League (Super Division introduced from 1980, Premier Division introduced from 2005)
Winners (30): 1939, 1943, 1944, 1951, 1954, 1955, 1956, 1959, 1960, 1962, 1963, 1964, 1965, 1969, 1976, 1978, 1979, 1983, 1984, 1986, 1990, 1992, 1994, 1997, 2001, 2005, 2007, 2008, 2009, 2018
Runners-up (40):1916,1920,1921,1925,1929,1934,1940,1945,1946,1948,1950,1958,1966,1970,1972,1973,1975,1977,1981,1982,1985,1987,1988,1989, 1991, 1993, 1995, 1996, 1998, 1999, 2000, 2003, 2004, 2006, 2012, 2019

IFA Shield

In 1911 Mohun Bagan became the first Indian club to win IFA Shield by defeating East Yorkshire Regiment 2–1 in the final. The second IFA Shield title came in 1947. Between 1976 and 1979 the club won IFA Shield four consecutive times.

 IFA Shield
Winners (20): 1911, 1947, 1948, 1954, 1956, 1960, 1961, 1962, 1969, 1976, 1977, 1978, 1979, 1981, 1982, 1987, 1989, 1998, 1999, 2003
Runners-up (20): 1923, 1940, 1945, 1949, 1951, 1958, 1965, 1972, 1974, 1975, 1984, 1986, 1994, 2000, 2004, 2006, 2008, 2011, 2017, 2018

Rovers Cup

Mohun Bagan is the most successful team in Rovers Cup, with 14 titles. They are also the first Indian civilian club to be invited to participate in the Rovers Cup.

 Rovers Cup
Winners (14) (record): 1955, 1966, 1968, 1970, 1971, 1972, 1976, 1977, 1981, 1985, 1988, 1991, 1992, 2000
Runners-up (10): 1923, 1948, 1956, 1961, 1964, 1965, 1967, 1969, 1986, 1987

Other Minor Titles

 Sikkim Gold Cup
Winners (10) (record): 1984, 1985, 1986, 1989, 1991, 1992, 1994, 2000, 2001, 2017
 Bordoloi Trophy
Winners (7) (record): 1974, 1975, 1976, 1977, 1984, 1996, 2001
 All Airlines Gold Cup
Winners (8) (record): 1989, 1991, 1993, 2000, 2002, 2004, 2005, 2012
 Coochbehar Cup
Winners (18): 1904, 1905, 1907, 1912, 1916, 1921, 1922, 1925, 1928, 1931, 1935, 1936, 1941, 1944, 1948, 1949, 1962, 1972
 Trades Cup
Winners (11): 1906, 1907, 1908, 1938, 1939, 1943, 1944, 1945, 1949, 1950, 1965
 Lakshmibilas Cup
Winners (7): 1909, 1910, 1928, 1937, 1939, 1940, 1941
 Gladstone Cup
Winners (4): 1905, 1906, 1908, 1911
 Sait Nagjee Football Tournament
Winners (2): 1978, 1981
 DCM Trophy
Winners (1): 1997
 Darjeeling Gold Cup
Winners (4): 1975, 1976, 1979, 1982
 Assam Independence Gold Cup
Winners (2): 1996, 1997
 ATPA Shield
Winners (1): 1993
 McDowell's Cup
Winners (1): 1996
 Scissors Cup
Winners (1): 1993
 PNB Centenary Invitational Trophy
Winners (1): 1995
 J.C. Guha Memorial Trophy
Winners (1): 1988
 Shibdas Bhaduri Memorial Tournament
Winners (1): 1993
 Amritabazar Centenary Trophy
Winners (1): 1968

Trophy Count

m Including minor trophies
s Shared records

Goalscoring records

Top scorers in National League/I-League

Top scorers in Calcutta League 

Source: Ei Samay (newspaper)

AFC Club Record

Updated on 1 April 2017

All stats as per Mohun Bagan official site

1 The AFC ordered that the 2nd leg was to be played in Malaysia due to a plague threat in India, but Mohun Bagan objected to the ruling; they were ejected from the competition, fined $3000 and banned from AFC competitions for three years. The ban was later removed.
2 The match was played over one leg by mutual agreement.

Player records
 Club's all-time top goalscorer -  Jose Ramirez Barreto (228 goals)
 Top goalscorer in National Football League/I-League -  Jose Ramirez Barreto (94)
 Top goalscorer in Calcutta Football League -  Chuni Goswami (145)

References

External links

Records